Systellura is a genus of nightjar in the family Caprimulgidae. 
It contains the following species:
 Band-winged nightjar (Systellura longirostris)
 Tschudi's nightjar (Systellura decussata)

 
Bird genera
Taxa named by Robert Ridgway